Operation Chopper may refer to:
Operation Chopper (commando raid), a British Commando raid in the Second World War
Operation Chopper (Vietnam), a United States operation in the Vietnam War